Syrians in Finland are immigrants from Syria residing in Finland. They are the second largest Arab community in Finland after Iraqis.

Migration
Nearly all Syrians in Finland have arrived as refugees. Syrians have been one of the smaller refugee groups in Finland in spite of the Syrian civil war, however they became the largest group in 2017.

Cities with large Syrian populations include Helsinki, Espoo, Vantaa and Lahti.

Organizations
The most active Syrian organization in Finland is Suomi-Syyria Ystävyysseura.

References

Ethnic groups in Finland